Trabiju is a municipality in the state of São Paulo in Brazil. The population is 1,738 (2020 est.) in an area of 63.4 km². The elevation is 548 m.

References

Municipalities in São Paulo (state)